Richard Calabro (born 14 April 1979) is a Yorkshire born actor who began his career in the children's TV drama The Ward, playing 'prankster' Digger Reily, until the character was eventually written out of the series in 1992. More recently, Calabro starred with Angela Griffiths in award-winning hospital drama Holby City.

Some other television credits include: Woof!, Mike & Angelo, Press Gang, Rosemary and Thyme, The Bill, Band of Gold, Mother Love, Casualty, My Hero, Emmerdale, Doctors, Seven Sisters, Seven Brothers, Macbeth (BBC 2001), Taggart, Caitlin's Way (HBO), A Touch of Frost, Little Boy Lost and Lear's Children.

Calabro made his stage debut in Boy George's hit musical Taboo in 2002 and also starred in the same show on the U.K No 1 tour in 2003.

Selected Appearances
 Holby City
 Taggart
 The Bill
 Caitlin's Way
 Life Support
 A Touch of Frost
 Band of Gold
 Casualty
 Woof!
 Press Gang
 Children's Ward
 Mother Love

References

1979 births
Living people
Male actors from Yorkshire
English male child actors
English male television actors
English people of Italian descent